The Mexican duck (Anas diazi) is a species of dabbling duck that breeds in Mexico and the southwestern United States.

Distribution and habitat
Most of the population is resident, but some northern birds migrate south to Mexico in winter. The species also occurs widely, but in limited numbers, in Colorado in all seasons and there are photographs of birds referable to this taxon from Utah, Wyoming, Nebraska, and Montana.

It is a bird of most wetlands, including ponds and rivers, and usually feeds by dabbling for plant food or grazing. It nests usually on a river bank, but not always particularly near water.

Diet
Mexican ducks are fond of the green shoots of alfafa and feed at night on irrigated fields.

Description
Both sexes of this 51–56 cm length bird resemble a female mallard, but with a slightly darker body. The Mexican duck is mainly brown, with a blue speculum edged with white, obvious in flight or at rest. The male has a brighter yellow bill than the female.

Call
The male has a nasal call, whereas the female has the very familiar "quack" commonly associated with ducks.

Taxonomy
Including the Mexican duck in the mallard is a relic from the usual practice of much of the mid-late 20th century, when all North American "mallardines" as well as the Hawaiian and Laysan ducks were included in the mallard proper as subspecies. This was based on the assumption that hybridization, producing fertile offspring, is an indicator of lack of speciation.

Rather, in these birds it indicates a fairly recent allopatric radiation, which has not yet established solid barriers against gene flow on the molecular level; mate choice is conferred by cues of behavior and plumage in the mallardine ducks, and this, under natural conditions, has precluded a strong selective pressure towards establishment of genetic incompatibility.

Conservation status
Although a species of least concern, the Mexican duck is undergoing a slow but marked decline due to destruction of habitat and overhunting. It hybridizes with mallards which are better-adapted to utilizing habitat altered by human activity and thus are spreading throughout this range. Concern has been expressed that this combination of factors may ultimately lead to the disappearance of the Mexican duck as a recognizable taxonomic entity (Rhymer & Simberloff 1996, McCracken et al. 2001, Rhymer 2006), but fairly limited measures such as wetland preservation and preferential hunting of drake mallards would prevent this. The Mexican duck was listed as endangered species at the United States Fish and Wildlife Service in 1967 but was removed in 1978.

References 
 American Ornithologists' Union (AOU) (1983): Check-list of North American Birds (6th edition). American Ornithologists' Union, Washington, DC.
Madge, Steve & Burn, Hilary (1987): Wildfowl : an identification guide to the ducks, geese and swans of the world. Christopher Helm, London. 
McCracken, Kevin G.; Johnson, William P. & Sheldon, Frederick H. (2001): Molecular population genetics, phylogeography, and conservation biology of the mottled duck (Anas fulvigula). Conservation Genetics 2(2): 87–102.  PDF fulltext
Rhymer, Judith M. (2006): Extinction by hybridization and introgression in anatine ducks. Acta Zoologica Sinica 52(Supplement): 583–585. PDF fulltext
Rhymer, Judith M. & Simberloff, Daniel (1996): Extinction by hybridization and introgression. Annu. Rev. Ecol. Syst. 27: 83-109.  (HTML abstract)

Footnotes

Anas
Ducks
Birds of Mexico
Least concern biota of Mexico
Least concern biota of North America
Birds described in 1886
Taxa named by Robert Ridgway

nah:Xomōtl